Andrew Brooke Leslie  (born December 26, 1957) is a retired Canadian Forces lieutenant-general and politician who served as the chief of the Land Staff from 2006 to 2010 and as a member of Parliament representing the riding of Orléans in the House of Commons, from the 2015 federal election to the 2019 election.

Background
Andrew Leslie was born in Ottawa in 1957. His father was Brigadier-General Edward Murray Dalziel Leslie (né McNaughton), commander of 1st Regiment, Royal Canadian Horse Artillery (1 RCHA)  during the Korean War. Leslie's father changed the family name from McNaughton to Leslie in order to comply with the terms of an inheritance from his aunt (and wife of James Norman Stuart Leslie, who was descendant of British Army Captain James Norman Stewart Leslie and General David Leslie). His paternal grandfather is former Chief of the General Staff and Minister of National Defence General Andrew McNaughton, and his maternal grandfather is former Canadian Minister of National Defence Brooke Claxton.

Military career
Leslie joined the 30th Field Regiment when at the University of Ottawa. In 1981 he transferred to the Regular Force. He went on to be Commanding Officer of 1st Regiment, Royal Canadian Horse Artillery in Shilo, Manitoba. While in London, England, as a graduate student he was attached to the Honourable Artillery Company.

Yugoslavia
In 1995 he was promoted to Colonel and sent to the Former Yugoslavia as Chief of Staff for Sector South. He then became the Chief of Staff and Deputy Commander of United Nations Confidence Restoration Operation in Croatia. Leslie was called to the International Criminal Tribunal for the former Yugoslavia (The Hague) as a witness in the war crimes trial of Croatian general Ante Gotovina.  Leslie, an artillery officer, testified to indiscriminate shelling of civilian areas by Croatian forces in August 1995, a conclusion rejected by both the appeals chamber of the International Criminal Tribunal for the former Yugoslavia in the Gotovina case and the International Court of Justice in the Croatia–Serbia genocide case. During the attack of the Croatian forces on the Serbian held Krajina region, he was credited with leading an operation which resulted in saving lives of 40 Serbian civilians.

Manitoba floods
He was the Area Chief of Staff during the Manitoba floods in Spring 1997. Later in 1997 he became the commander of 1 Canadian Mechanized Brigade Group which was sent to the South shore of Montreal to help with disaster relief operations. In 2000 he was given responsibility for communications in the Canadian Forces and in 2002 he became the commander of Land Force Central Area. He became Deputy Commander of the International Security Assistance Force in Afghanistan in 2003 and then became Assistant Chief of the Land Staff in 2004. In June 2006 he was appointed Chief of the Land Staff.

Chief of Transformation
In June 2010, General Leslie was replaced as Chief of Land Staff by Lieutenant-General Peter Devlin and was named Chief of Transformation for the Canadian Forces. In this position, Leslie was responsible for releasing the 2011 Report on Transformation, which, among other changes, recommended scaling back the Primary Reserves to boost the Regular Forces and significantly cutting headquarters' budgets and transferring the amounts to front line combat units. Leslie referred to this as transforming the Forces into "more tooth and less tail," a phrase that was used by Prime Minister Stephen Harper and Minister of National Defence Peter MacKay. Some saw Leslie's report as recommending to sacrifice too many sacred cows, namely the bloated headquarters organizations.

Retirement
Leslie retired in September 2011 after 35 years in uniform and was subsequently hired by CGI Group to lead their new Defence, Public Safety and Intelligence unit in Ottawa.

Post-military career
Before Leslie officially retired from the military, Leslie was approached by several members of the Prime Minister's Office to inquire about whether he was interested in heading a federal department or organization. These included discussions with Prime Minister Harper's Deputy Chiefs of Staff Derek Vanstone and Jenni Byrne about potentially heading the Canadian Museum of Civilization. Once Leslie retired from the military he was approached again, this time about heading the Royal Canadian Mounted Police. Leslie declined.

Liberal advisor and candidacy
On September 18, 2013, Leslie was named co-chair of the Liberal International Affairs Council of Advisors, providing advice on foreign and defence issues to Liberal Party of Canada leader Justin Trudeau. Leslie also ran to be the Liberal candidate in the 2015 general election in the riding of Orléans. He was elected the Member of Parliament for Orléans in the 2015 election ahead of Conservative incumbent Royal Galipeau.

Member of Parliament
Leslie was elected into the House of Commons of Canada as an MP and on November 20, 2015, he was named Chief Government Whip in the Commons. On February 15, 2016, Leslie was sworn in as a Member of the Queen's Privy Council for Canada according to his duties as Chief Government Whip.

On May 1, 2019, Leslie announced that he will not be seeking re-election in the upcoming federal election. On May 3, 2019, Leslie confirmed that he would be testifying for the defence at Vice-Admiral Mark Norman's breach of trust trial. On May 7, 2019, the Canadian Broadcasting Corporation reported that Canada's Public Prosecution Service planned to withdraw charges against Norman.

Honours and decorations 
Leslie received the following honours and decorations during and after his military career.

 During His Career Andrew Leslie Also Served as an Aide-de-camp.
 He was a qualified Paratrooper and as such wore the Canadian Forces Jump Wings.

Electoral history

References

1957 births
Living people
Canadian generals
Military personnel from Ottawa
Canadian military personnel of the War in Afghanistan (2001–2021)
CGI Group people
Commanders of the Order of Military Merit (Canada)
Foreign recipients of the Legion of Merit
Honourable Artillery Company officers
Politicians from Ottawa
Recipients of the Meritorious Service Decoration
Liberal Party of Canada MPs
Members of the House of Commons of Canada from Ontario
Members of the King's Privy Council for Canada
21st-century Canadian politicians
Commanders of the Canadian Army
Royal Regiment of Canadian Artillery officers